Nile FM is a privately owned English-language radio station based in Cairo, Egypt, that plays English-language music hits and is owned by Nile Radio Productions. Nile FM airs at 104.2 FM. Some of the station's most popular programs are The Big Breakfast hosted by Rob Stevens and Sarah Abdelmoneim, American Top 40 hosted by Ryan Seacrest, Future Sound of Egypt with Aly and Fila, A State of Trance with Armin van Buuren.

References

External links 
 Nile FM Official Website

Radio stations in Egypt
English-language radio stations
Mass media in Cairo
2003 establishments in Egypt
Radio stations established in 2003